Jødekager, also known as Joedekager (meaning "Jewish cookie" in Danish), is a popular cookie of Danish Jewish origin. The cookie originated in the Danish Jewish community in Denmark starting in the 1700s, though the current version dates back to 1856. Its name likely originates from bearing a similar appearance to cakes sold in Jewish bakeries. It remains popular to this day, notably during Christmas.

History
The cookies have Sephardi origins from Iberian Jews who resettled in the Netherlands after the Spanish Inquisition. In the Encyclopedia of Jewish Food, Gil Marks writes that "these Spanish and Portuguese Jews merged their Moorish-influenced Iberian fare with the local Scandinavian cuisine." Due to wide availability, butter was used instead of olive oil. Variations on Joodse boterkoeke (Jewish butter cookies) eventually spread to Denmark and elsewhere in Scandinavia, as well as England and Germany. By the 16th century, Jewish bakeries in Copenhagen were producing a local version of butter cookies topped with nuts and cinnamon. The cookies are still known for their Jewish provenance, but have become beloved throughout Danish society. Because butter cookies were a Christmas tradition for Danish Christians, Jewish butter cookies became a popular Christmas dessert.

See also
 Jodenkoek
 Rugelach
 Hamantash
 Tahini cookie
 History of the Jews in Denmark
 Jewish cuisine

References

Christmas food
Christmas in Denmark
Danish cuisine
Jews and Judaism in Denmark
Jewish cookies
Sephardi Jewish cuisine
Sephardi Jewish culture in Europe